DeLange is a contraction of the Dutch surname De Lange (meaning "the tall one"). It may refer to:

Eddie DeLange American bandleader 
Ilse DeLange Dutch singer 
François Delange Belgian Physician and thyroid researcher
Raymond Delange (1898-1976), French Army general